War Music may refer to:

 War Music (composition), a 2015 musical composition by James Ledger
 War Music (poem), a project of British poet Christopher Logue
 War Music (Refused album)
 War Music (Slim the Mobster album)
 War Music (Vampire Rodents album)

See also
 War song
 Urgh! A Music War